Mohd Puad Zarkashi (Jawi: فؤاد زرکشي) (born 7 July 1957) is a Malaysian politician who has served as Speaker of the Johor State Legislative Assembly since April 2022 and Member of the Johor State Legislative Assembly (MLA) for Rengit since March 2022. He served as Deputy Minister of Education in the Barisan Nasional (BN) administration under former Prime Minister Najib Razak and former Minister Muhyiddin Yassin from April 2009 to May 2013, Member of Parliament (MP) for Batu Pahat from March 2008 to May 2013, Senator from October 2004 to October 2007 and Director-General of Special Affairs Department (JASA) from March 2015 to his resignation in April 2018. He is a member of the United Malays National Organisation (UMNO), a component party of the ruling BN coalition. He is also Member of the Supreme Council of UMNO.

Early life and education 

Puad is of Banjar descent. He holds a Doctor of Philosophy conferred by the University of Hull.

Political career 

Puad was elected at the 2008 election for the seat previously held by UMNO's Junaidy Abdul Wahab. He had previously been a Senator. Puad served one term in Parliament, after being defeated in the 2013 election by Mohd Idris Jusi of the opposition People's Justice Party (PKR). Despite his defeat, he was re-elected to UMNO's 25-member Supreme Council later in the year. Puad was dropped as candidate by UMNO in the 2018 general election.

In April 2008, Puad called for the resignation of then Prime Minister Abdullah Ahmad Badawi after UMNO's performance in the 2008 election.

When Najib Razak replaced Abdullah as Prime Minister in April 2009, Puad was appointed a Deputy Education Minister.

Puad was appointed as JASA director-general in March 2015 but he quit on 25 April 2018 in protest for not being picked as a BN candidate for the 2018 general election. JASA was somehow disbanded months later by the new Pakatan Harapan (PH) government after the downfall of the BN in the 2018 election.

Controversies 

In September 2012, Puad stated his belief that homosexuals could be identified through various means including the use of "V-Neck and sleeveless clothing" as well as a person's personal preference for "tight and light-colored clothing". He stated that these characteristics were "symptoms" which would allow parents to spot whether or not their son may be a homosexual, supporting the need to discipline them into turning straight "like it's a disease which can be cured" – a stance that is also endorsed by Malaysia's Education Ministry because they believe that this could actually affect one's ability to learn.

Election results

Honours
  :
  Commander of the Order of Meritorious Service (PJN) - Datuk (2014)
  :
  Knight Companion of the Order of Sultan Ahmad Shah of Pahang (DSAP) - Dato' (2009)

References

Living people
Members of the Dewan Rakyat
Members of the Dewan Negara
Alumni of the University of Hull
United Malays National Organisation politicians
1957 births
People from Johor
Commanders of the Order of Meritorious Service
Malaysian people of Malay descent
Malaysian Muslims
Malaysian people of Banjar descent
21st-century Malaysian politicians